Dagvyn Luvsansharav (1927-2014) is a Mongolian composer. Described as having a "rich repertoire of Mongolian songs which have a special place",  he is perhaps best known for his Sükhbaataryn Magtuu (Praise of Sükhbaatar) or his ballet Legend of the Sun. His music featured in the 1994 Mongolian film Toorog, directed by Yondonbaliin Tserendolgor.  Luvsansharav became an Honoured Artist of the Republic in the early sixties.

References

Mongolian composers
1927 births
2014 deaths
20th-century composers
20th-century male musicians
21st-century composers
21st-century male musicians
People from Khentii Province
Male composers
People's Artists of Mongolia